Gorji Mahalleh may refer to:
 Gorji Mahalleh, Golestan
 Gorji Mahalleh, Mazandaran